Rhenald Kasali (born in Jakarta, August 13, 1960) is an academic and businessman from Indonesia. He is a Management Science professor (Guru Besar) at the Faculty of Economics, Universitas Indonesia. Kasali was confirmed as a professor on July 4, 2009.

Career 
Kasali lectures at the Faculty of Economics and is Chairman of the Graduate Management Science University's Faculty of Economics. In addition to his work as an academician, he holds a Ph.D. from the University of Illinois at Urbana-Champaign and is a writer. His books are about business.

Books 
His books include:
 
Membidik Pasar Indonesia: Segmentasi, Targeting dan Positioning (Looking at Indonesian Market: Segmentation, Targeting and Positioning), Gramedia Pustaka Utama (1998)
Sukses Melakukan Presentasi (Conducting Successful Presentations), Gramedia Publisher(2000)
Myelin, Mobilisasi Intangibles Menjadi Kekuatan Perubahan (Myelin: Intangibles Mobilization as the Force of Changes), Gramedia Pustaka Utama (2010)
Wirausaha Muda Mandiri (Independent Young Entrepreneur), Gramedia Pustaka Utama (2010)
Out of the Crisis: Building Strength Through New Core Belief and Values.
"Cracking Zone" (Revolusi gaya hidup ketika income perkapita kita menembus US$3,000 dan bagaimana menangkap peluang ini) Gramedia Pustaka, 2010.

Appointments 
He is a visiting lecturer at the Master of Management Programme at Universitas Sam Ratulangi, Universitas Tanjungpura, Universitas Udayana, and Universitas Lampung.

On July 4, 2009, Rhenald was elected as professor (Guru Besar) of Management Science at Universitas Indonesia.

References

Living people
Academic staff of the University of Indonesia
1960 births